The 302 Squadron "Falcões" / "Águias Reais" is an attack and air defense squadron of the Portuguese Air Force (PoAF) disbanded in 1996.

Roles and missions
The Attack Squadron 302 "Falcões" had as its primary mission the tactical air support for maritime operations (TASMO), and has its secondary missions air defense and air interdiction (AI).

During the Cold War, the 302 Sqn. had the mission to ensure the defense of the North Atlantic Ocean to ensure and support NATO's ability to rearm and resupply Europe during times of war.

History
Activated in July 1981 under the command of Lieutenant Colonel Vitor Rodrigues da Silva, the 302 Squadron "Falcões" adopted and continued the tradition of the then-disbanded 201 Squadron and of the former PoAF "Falcões" squadrons. On December 24, 1981, the 302 Sqn. started to operate the first delivered A-7P Corsair II.

With the reactivation of 201 Squadron "Falcões" in 1993, the nickname of the 302 Sqn. was changed to "Águias Reais" (Royal Eagles). In 1996 the squadron was disbanded and its human and aircraft resources were integrated with its sister squadron, 304 Squadron "Magníficos", until that squadron's retirement in 1999.

Aircraft
 LTV A-7P Corsair II (1981–1996)
 TA-7C Corsair II (1982–1984)Nicknamed pomba branca (White dove) due to the United States Navy's painting Aircraft leased by the United States Navy to Portugal for the operational conversion of A-7 pilots before the delivery of the first TA-7P Corsair II bought in a second order that same year.

Commanders
 Lt. Colonel PILAV Vitor Rodrigues da Silva (July, 1981 – January, 1983)
 Major PILAV Cândido Duarte Reis (January, 1983 – October, 1984)
 Major PILAV José Jordão (October, 1984 – September, 1985)
 Major PILAV Armando Teixeira Marques (September, 1985 – May, 1986)
 Major PILAV João Brandão Ferreira (May, 1986 – September, 1988)
 Major PILAV Carlos Guerra (September, 1988 – July, 1989)
 Lt. Colonel PILAV Joaquim Augusto Soares (July, 1989 – December, 1989)
 Major PILAV Francisco Martins Batista (March, 1990 – November, 1992)
 Major PILAV Joaquim Soares de Almeida (November, 1992 – June, 1994)
 Major PILAV Carlos Barata dos Santos (June, 1994 – March, 1996)
 Major PILAV Eurico Craveiro (March, 1996)
 Major PILAV Rui Elvas (interim) (March, 1996 – May, 1996)

See also
 Portuguese Air Force
 Cold War
 Northern Wedding
 201 Squadron
 List of A-7 Corsair II operators

External links
 List of commanders of 302 Squadron 
 The Flight of the Corsair (Archived 2009-10-22), website about the service of the A-7 Corsair II in the PoAF

Portuguese Air Force aircraft squadrons